Echidna amblyodon, the Sulawesi moray is a moray eel found in the western central Pacific Ocean. It was described by Bleeker in 1856, originally under the genus Muraena. It is a marine, tropical eel which is known from Indonesia, in the western central Pacific Ocean.

References

amblyodon
Taxa named by Pieter Bleeker
Fish described in 1856